Student Central was a students' facility of the University of London. It was previously the students' union of the federal University of London, known as the University of London Union (commonly referred to as ULU, pron. 'yoo-loo'), which was closed and transformed into Student Central in August 2014. Since the closure of its student governance, each student is instead primarily affiliated to a student union of their individual college, as the University of London is a federal structure encompassing many constituent colleges.

ULU provided a range of services on an intercollegiate basis, including cultural, recreational and sporting activities. Its seven-floor building in Malet Street, Central London, next to Birkbeck, University of London, included bars, restaurants, shops, banks, a swimming pool and a live music venue.

In 2021 it was announced that Student Central would be closing and that the university would be leasing the building to Birkbeck College as an expansion of their teaching space.

History

ULU was founded in 1921, originally as the University of London Union Society, and moved into its main building on Malet Street, near Senate House, in 1957. It represented students to the university and beyond, whilst also providing support and resources to the students' unions of individual colleges.

On 3 May 2013, the University of London announced that the union would cease to exist. This move was condemned by some students and campaign groups, who ran a campaign to keep the building in student hands. Other students however welcomed the move; this was in part due to fears that the union was undemocratic, as it recorded a very low election turnout of just 2%. This was against the backdrop of higher turnouts at other student union elections.

At the time of its closure, it was one of Europe's largest student unions representing over 120,000 University of London students.

Upon the University of London Union's abolition, its former building and website was rebranded as 'Student Central, London', and is now operated by the former staff of ULU employed by the University of London. 'Student Central, London' offers full membership to University of London students, and associate membership to other university students, and other groups.

In March 2017, national promoter & event management company VMS Live agreed a deal with Student Central to bring live music back to the former ULU venue. At the time of writing many high-profile gigs have been confirmed firmly putting the venue back on the national touring circuit

Activities
ULU aimed to represent the diverse students and students’ unions of the University of London.

The ULU building and venue was widely known as one for gigs that launched major artists such as the Kaiser Chiefs and Goldfrapp.

The union funded and published a student newspaper, London Student, although the editorial content was not controlled by the union as a whole but solely by the elected Editor. London Student was relaunched as a co-operative in January 2015.

Sports
One of ULU's main activities was the provision of Sport Leagues and Sport Clubs. The leagues originally only included teams within the University of London. Now they include University teams from the London area that are not in UoL. The governance of these is carried out by Sports Officers from the Universities and Colleges Students' Unions that have at least one sports team in the league. The sports leagues are also supported by the Friends of University of London Sport, whose members were former Sports Officers from within the University of London.

The union was home to Central London's largest swimming pool.

In 2015, the UL Athletics and XC club established the London Colleges Athletics Series (LCAS) along with King's College London, University College London and Imperial College London. LCAS has since merged with the long-standing London Colleges League to form the London Universities and Colleges Athletics.

References

External links
Student Central, London (successor  body to ULU)

Student organizations established in 1921
London
University of London
University sports venues in the United Kingdom
University swimming in the United Kingdom